KSUA (91.5 FM) is a student-run college radio station licensed to Fairbanks, Alaska, United States. Broadcasting from the University of Alaska Fairbanks (UAF) campus with 3,000 watts effective radiated power (ERP,) it serves the Alaska Interior area. When first on the air in 1984, it was one of a few commercially licensed college stations. Reorganized in 1993, KSUA now operates under the FCC non-commercial educational license public radio rules. KSUA has won statewide and national broadcasting awards.

Prehistory of KSUA
KSUA-FM did not go on the air until the mid-1980s, but the station's roots stretch back for two decades before that, to the first UAF radio station, KUAC-FM. KUAC, the Fairbanks North Star Borough's public radio station, went on the air October 1, 1962, operating out of the Constitution Hall studios KSUA now occupies.  KUAC was the first public radio station in Alaska, and also the first FM station serving the Interior. It would blaze the trail for other stations to come. In 1971, KUAC moved its radio and new TV broadcasting facilities into the lower level of the UAF Fine Arts Building.

KUAC was joined a decade later by carrier current outlet KMPS, the precursor to KSUA. Established by the UAF student government, KMPS went on air March 24, 1971. It was a "Progressive rock" campus radio station. The existing AC electoral wiring in the dorms and other campus buildings were used as a broadcast antenna; only AM radios near the buildings could receive its signal.

KMPS quickly tired of its limited listener base. In the mid-1970s, the push to become a licensed on-air broadcaster began. For that, a new call sign would be needed. Unlicensed carrier current stations have no claim on or requirement for a call sign, and in 1978, the FCC assigned the KMPS-FM call sign to a station based in Seattle, Washington.

Commercial years

On September 6, 1984, KSUA-FM came on the air at the frequency of 103.9 MHz, operating under a commercial broadcast license from the FCC. Both KMPS and KSUA took in advertising revenue. The licensee was called Student Media, Inc. (SMI). That nonprofit corporation had been formed to operate the station.

Playing what is referred to in the radio industry as the "album-oriented rock" or AOR format (focusing on 'deep albums tracks' in addition to more popular singles), KSUA-FM began as one of the few commercial college stations in the country, as are WHUR-FM at Howard University and WPGU at the University of Illinois at Urbana-Champaign.  The early KSUA operated with relative autonomy, with few direct ties to the university, as a culture had existed since the 1940s at UAF of providing student services independent of the university.

KSUA "Rock for the Great Land" quickly became the most popular station in the Greater Fairbanks area, with a format of playing a wide range of music  that included Classic Rock, Alternative, Heavy Metal, Industrial, traditional Chicago and Delta Blues, Grunge (well before the genre became widely recognized) and a host of Independent recording acts.  The format and content of each show was left largely up to the DJ of that show. The station served as a launching pad for 'Glenner and Jerry' (aka Glen Anderson and Jerry Evans), popular local announcers who enlivened the morning show format in Fairbanks. They would leave the station in 1987 for KWLF in Fairbanks. In 2013 they still worked in local radio but at different stations. D.J. Jamie Canfield, went on to work for several independent record labels including Rounder Records, Rykodisc and Righteous Babe Records, voice work for several Rockstar Games, including Grand Theft Auto Vice City, and in 2011, he was Program Director at KSKI-FM in Hailey, Idaho.

KSUA's fortunes began to decline in the late 1980s. In 1987, commercial contemporary hit radio station KWLF began broadcasting; it then hired away Anderson and Evans. With new competition and  decline of the Alaskan economy during the same period, KSUA's stability as a commercial radio entity diminished. As Fairbanks's radio market expanded with more new stations in the early 1990s, acute financial troubles began to plague KSUA.  The station's advertising revenues steadily declined amidst an increasingly competitive broadcasting landscape.  KSUA was eventually unable to meet its payroll demands to both management and on-air staff.  The formerly-paid DJs were asked to volunteer, but in protest, one of them filed a wage claim with the Department of Labor, and KSUA was forced to give out almost $45,000 in unpaid wages. Out of money, KSUA went dark March 8, 1993.

Transformation, transition, and growth

The station stayed off the air until the end of 1993. During its downtime, SMI was dissolved, and the license for KSUA was transferred to the UA Board of Regents, to be held in trust for the students of UAF. In September the Associated Students University of Alaska Fairbanks (ASUAF) bill, called "Governance Agreement For The KSUA Media Board", was passed. It recreated KSUA as a public radio station, under the authority of the new KSUA Media Board.  The station's chief engineer brought the system up to FCC standards. A new antenna was purchased, placed on the Moore Residence Hall on the Upper Campus. When KSUA came back on the air, it had new equipment and new management. The new KSUA came back on the air December 2, 1993, playing the same song the station had shut down with: Pearl Jam's "Alive."

Until 1982—just years before KSUA went on air—the portion of the FM band below 100 MHz, including the typical noncommercial educational reserved band of 88–92 MHz, was reserved in Alaska for telecommunications purposes. As a result, KSUA and KUAC, as well as other public radio stations in Alaska such as KSKA, operated on licenses that, if sold, could be converted to commercial operation. With KSUA now operating as a public radio station, Borealis Broadcasting, a local media company wanted its frequency for a new commercial station. Borealis purchased the defunct KUWL, a Christian radio station that had operated at 91.5 FM from 1985 to 1993, and swapped it to the university for the 103.9 frequency, which could be operated commercially. In exchange, the university received a new antenna and transmitter system valued at $26,000, as well as $10,000 in additional payments—all extremely valuable in the face of budget cuts. As a result, in April 1996, KSUA moved to 91.5 FM, and Borealis started a new commercial station, also named KUWL, at 103.9 with the former KSUA license.

Sports
KSUA provides live play-by-play coverage of University of Alaska Nanooks hockey.  Veteran broadcaster Bruce Cech is the play-by-play announcer for all Nanook hockey games.  KSUA streams all games live on their website, ksua.org.  KSUA is the only radio station to provide Nanook hockey game coverage as no commercial radio station throughout the Fairbanks radio market airs their games.

General Managers
There can be anywhere from 30 to 100 volunteers at one time, normally managed by 6-9 paid student staff members (depending on the needs at the time).  These positions are normally kept for a year or two and are reviewed annually by the General Manager.  The General Manager in turn is reviewed by the Media Board.  The Media Board is a small board of volunteer UAF students and UAF staff who oversee the monthly operations of the station and the General Manager.  They also approve the annual budget and assist in helping the General Manager make large decisions.

Awards
As of Fall 2019, KSUA has won over 100 statewide broadcasting awards. In 2012 it was among the top 10 college stations nationwide competing for the MTV college radio woodie award. The next year KSUA won the College Radio Woodie Award.

Alaska Broadcasters Association Awards

Radiostar Awards by Radio Flag

References

External links
 KSUA Website
 KSUA YouTube Channel
 

1984 establishments in Alaska
SUA
Radio stations established in 1984
Mass media in Fairbanks, Alaska
SUA
University of Alaska Fairbanks